Changalva (also Romanized as Changalvā; also known as Chungīlu, Chungilwa, Qal‘eh-i-Changalābād, Qal‘eh-ye Changalābād, Sanqorābād, and Sonqorābād) is a village in Dehdasht-e Gharbi Rural District, in the Central District of Kohgiluyeh County, Kohgiluyeh and Boyer-Ahmad Province, Iran. At the 2006 census, its population was 1,505, in 262 families.

References 

Populated places in Kohgiluyeh County